L'infermiera di notte, internationally released as Night Nurse, is a 1979 commedia sexy all'italiana film written and directed by Mariano Laurenti.

Plot    
Doctor Nicola Pischella is an unrepentant womanizer who systematically cheats on his jealous wife Lucia between visits to his dental office. Things get complicated when the old and weird Saverio, Lucia's uncle, arrives at the Pischella house, who says he is ill and now close to death.

In exchange for hospitality and assistance, she promises a generous bequest to her niece. To provide for the elderly relative, the beautiful Angela Della Torre is hired as a night nurse with whom Carlo, a young and shy student son of Nicola, will fall in love, and who will make the dentist himself and his clumsy assistant Peppino lose his head.

Between misunderstandings, betrayals and personal exchanges, which will also include Zaira, Nicola's historical lover, and a busty neighbor, Angela will get engaged to Carlo, while it will be discovered that Saverio is not Lucia's real uncle, but an impostor who had entered his house only to steal a precious diamond hidden in the chandelier.

Cast 
Gloria Guida: Angela Della Torre
Lino Banfi: Nicola Pischella
Alvaro Vitali: Peppino
Leo Colonna: Carlo Pischella
Mario Carotenuto: Zio Saverio / Alfredo
Francesca Romana Coluzzi: Lucia, wife of Nicola
Paola Senatore: Zaira 
Anna Maria Clementi: Moglie del pugile
Lucio Montanaro: D.J.

See also      
 List of Italian films of 1979

References

External links

1979 films
Commedia sexy all'italiana
Films directed by Mariano Laurenti
Films about health care
1970s sex comedy films
1979 comedy films
1970s Italian-language films
1970s Italian films